The Correction Stakes is an American Thoroughbred horse race run annually at Aqueduct Racetrack in Ozone Park, Queens, New York. A non-graded stakes race for fillies and mares age four and older, it is raced on dirt over a distance of six furlongs. It currently offers a purse of $100,000. Inaugurated in 1940 at Jamaica Race Course, following that track's closure the race was moved in 1960 to its current location at Aqueduct Racetrack. The race was named in honor of Correction, a filly owned by John Morris and his son, Alfred, and trained by U. S. Racing Hall of Fame inductee, R. Wyndham Walden.

The race was open to fillies and mares age three and older from inception through 2014 with the exception of 1952 when it was made available to fillies and mares of all ages. In 2015 the race was changed to a contest for fillies and mares four years and older.

The inaugural Correction Handicap took place on October 19, 1940 and was won by Calumet Farm's filly Little Risk ridden by George Woolf and trained by Jimmy Jones, both future Hall of Fame inductees.

In 1954 and 1955 it was run in two divisions.

Records
Speed record:
 1:09.20 @ 6 Furlongs – Soul Mate (1973)

Most wins:
 2 – Searching (1958, 1959) 
 2 – Affectionately (1964, 1965)
 2 – Shy Dawn (1976, 1977)
 2 – Cagey Exuberance (1988, 1989)
 2 – Missy's Mirage (1992, 1993)
 2 – Magnolia Jackson (2006, 2007)
 2 – Clothes Fall Off (2016, 2017)

Most wins by a jockey:
 7 – Ángel Cordero Jr. (1976, 1977, 1983, 1984, 1986, 1988, 1990)

Most wins by a trainer:
 4 – Hirsch Jacobs (1956, 1958, 1964, 1965)
 4 – Kiaran P. McLaughlin (2005, 2015, 2016, 2017)

Most wins by an owner:
 4 – Ethel D. Jacobs (1956, 1958, 1964, 1965)

Winners

References

Ungraded stakes races in the United States
Sprint category horse races for fillies and mares
Horse races in New York City
Aqueduct Racetrack
Recurring sporting events established in 1940
1940 establishments in New York City